This is a list of companies based in Satu Mare, Romania.

Autonet Group
Sam Mills
UNIO
Coinvertit (Contessa Ltd)

 
Lists of companies of Romania